Zaschka is a German habitational surname for someone from Zatzschke and can refer to:

 Engelbert Zaschka (1895–1955), a German chief engineer, chief designer, inventor and helicopter pioneer 
 Milly Zaschka (d. 1975), a German singer of operas, actor and stage director

Surnames